The following is a list of people executed by the U.S. state of Idaho since capital punishment was resumed in 1976.

All of the following people have been executed for murder since the Gregg v. Georgia decision. All 3 were executed by lethal injection.

See also 
 Capital punishment in Idaho
 Capital punishment in the United States

References

 
People executed
Idaho